Arimalam is a Town Panchayath in the district of Pudukkottai, in the state of Tamil Nadu, India.

Geography
It has an average elevation of 66 metres (216 feet). It is 22 kilometers away from Pudukkottai and is well connected by public transport.

Rulers
Arimalam is part of an area that saw rulers from the Chola dynasty, Pandyan dynasty,   and the Thondaiman dynasty. It became part of the princely state of Pudukkottai under British rule.

Demographics
As of the 2011 Indian census, The Arimalam city is divided into 15 wards for which elections are held every 5 years. The Arimalam Town Panchayat has population of 19,948 of which 10,552 are males while 9,448 are females as per report released by Census India 2015.

Population of Children with age of 0-6 is 890 which is 9.95% of total population of Arimalam (TP). In Arimalam Town Panchayat, Female Sex Ratio is of 1004 against state average of 996. Moreover, Child Sex Ratio in Arimalam is around 1,055 compared to Tamil Nadu state average of 943.

Literacy rate of Arimalam city is 78.98% lower than state average of 80.09%. In Arimalam, Male literacy is around 87.25% while female literacy rate is 70.69%.

Arimalam Town Panchayat has total administration over 2,184 houses to which it supplies basic amenities like water and sewerage. It is also authorized to build roads within Town Panchayat limits and impose taxes on properties coming under its jurisdiction.

Schools

Government Boys Higher Secondary School
Government Girls Higher Secondary School
Government Primary School
Government Primary School, Meenakshipuram  
Government Primary School, Kamatchipuram
Sri Sivaakamalam Matriculation Higher Secondary School (Tamil & English Medium)
Mercury Primary School (English Medium)
Sri Raja Victory School (English Medium)

References

External links
 Government School - Old Student Association FB Page 
 Government School - Old Student Association Twitter Page 
 Official website of Pudukkottai District

 Sri Sivaakamalam Matriculation Higher Secondary School

 Arimalam Vaa Nanba

Arimalam

Cities and towns in Pudukkottai district